ANP may refer to:

In politics and government
Afghan National Police
Agência Nacional do Petróleo, Gás Natural e Biocombustíveis or National Agency of Petroleum, Natural Gas and Biofuels (Brazil), a regulatory agency in Brazil
American Nazi Party, an American Neo-Nazi political party.
Assembleia Nacional Popular, the legislature in Guinea-Bissau
Awami National Party, a left-wing Pakistani political party

News media
 Algemeen Nederlands Persbureau (Netherlands national news agency), a news agency from the Netherlands
 American News Project, an independent internet news broadcaster
 Associated Negro Press

Places in the United States
Acadia National Park, Maine
Arches National Park, Utah

Science
Analytic network process, a mathematical decision making technique similar to Analytic Hierarchy Process
Atrial natriuretic peptide, a peptide hormone.
Acyclic nucleoside phosphonate, a group of antiviral drugs

Other uses
Adult Nurse Practitioner
Aircraft Nuclear Propulsion
ANP, IATA airport code and FAA location identifier of Lee Airport, Annapolis, Maryland, United States
anp, ISO 639-2 and 639-3 code for the Angika language, spoken in India and Nepal
ANP (band), a Japanese band featuring KK Null
Anpao or Anp, the two-faced Lakota god of the dawn in Native American mythology